Joel Wilson may refer to:

 Joel Wilson (umpire) (born 1966), cricket umpire from Trinidad and Tobago
 Joel Wilson (rugby) (born 1977), Australian rugby player